Bangladesh National Women Lawyers' Association (বাংলাদেশ জাতীয় মহিলা আইনজীবী সমিতি) is a lawyer's association based in Dhaka, Bangladesh. It was established in 1979. Its main goal is "to create equal opportunities and equal rights for every woman and child in the country."

References

External links
Official site (is no longer valid, at least at this URL, which is listed as being for sale) 8 April 2019
Facebook site

Women's organisations based in Bangladesh
Legal organisations based in Bangladesh
1979 establishments in Bangladesh
Human rights in Bangladesh
Organizations established in 1979
Women's rights in Bangladesh
Law-related professional associations
Professional associations for women